Tighenif District is a district of Mascara Province, Algeria.

Municipalities
The district is further divided into 3 municipalities:
Tighennif
Sidi Kada
Sehailia

Districts of Mascara Province